Pratol is a flavonoid,  4′-O-methylated 4′,7-dihydroxyflavone. It can be found in Trifolium pratense.

References 

O-methylated flavones